Yecla de Yeltes is a large municipality in the province of Salamanca,  western Spain, part of the autonomous community of Castile-Leon. It is located 76 kilometres from the city of Salamanca and as of 2003 has a population 339 people. The municipality covers an area of 57 km².  It lies 723 metres above sea level and the postal code is 37219.

References

Municipalities in the Province of Salamanca